Klemenčevo is a small dispersed settlement in the Kamnik Alps in the Municipality of Kamnik in the Upper Carniola region of Slovenia.

References

External links 
Klemenčevo on Geopedia

Populated places in the Municipality of Kamnik